The Dark Dance is the fourth album by Irish band Tír na nÓg. It is their first new album of original material in 42 years following the release of Strong in the Sun in 1973. The album was released on May 24, 2015 on the band's own label. An LP version was planned to be released during Summer 2017 on Mega Dodo Records.

Track listing

Personnel
Tír na nÓg
Sonny Condell – vocals, guitar, bongos, instruments
Leo O'Kelly – vocals, guitar, bongos, instruments

Additional musician
Garvan Gallagher – bass (track 7, 9)

Release history

References

2015 albums
Tír na nÓg (band) albums